Norman William Ralston (November 28, 1916 – November 14, 2007) was an American pilot.

Biography
During World War II, Ralston, known as "Swede", trained hundreds of Army pilots at Rankin Field in Tulare, California. Rankin Aeronautical Academy was a civilian flight school for the United States Army Air Corps.

As a stunt pilot, he operated a fleet of aircraft for Ralston Airshows. He became famous for flying an AT-6 Texan through Naval Air Station Tillamook, a World War II blimp hangar, in Tillamook, Oregon. Ralston constructed the first commercial hangar at Hillsboro, Oregon and helped found the Hillsboro Airport. He co-founded the airline company Aero Air, a successful full-service fixed-base operator.

Awards
Charles Taylor Master Mechanic Award
International Council of Air Shows Hall of Fame Award
Federal Aviation Administration's Wright Brothers Master Pilot Award

References

External links
Aero Air official website
International Council of Air Shows Foundation

1916 births
2007 deaths
Aviators from Oregon
People from Forest Grove, Oregon
People from Hillsboro, Oregon
American people of Swedish descent
American flight instructors